The Bullmastiff is a British breed of dog of mastiff type and large size, with a solid build and a short muzzle. It was developed as a guard dog in the nineteenth century by cross-breeding the English Mastiff with the now-extinct Old English Bulldog. It was recognised as a breed by The Kennel Club in 1924.

History 

The origins of the Bullmastiff are unclear. In the eighteenth century, in some regions of England, the Old English Mastiff and English Bulldog were commonly inter-bred to produce dogs suitable for work guarding people and their property. By the beginning of the twentieth century this cross-breed was in widespread use as an aid to gamekeepers in the control of poaching. They were bred by gamekeepers for strength, size and speed using a cross of the tough, heavy and aggressive Bulldog of the nineteenth century with the large, strong, less aggressive Mastiff. As a result, the Bullmastiff is known as the Gamekeeper's Night Dog.

The Bullmastiff was recognised as a breed by The Kennel Club in 1924. Dogs had to have a minimum of four generations of descent from Bullmastiff stock without input from either Bulldog or Mastiff; cross-bred animals could not be registered. The American Kennel Club recognised it in 1934. It was definitively accepted by the Fédération Cynologique Internationale in 1955.

In 1928, the diamond mining company De Beers imported Bullmastiffs to South Africa to guard the mines.

Appearance

  

The Bullmastiff is a large dog.

The coat may be fawn, red or brindle, in any shade; some limited white marking on the chest is allowed. The muzzle is black, becoming paler towards the eyes.

It is a brachycephalic dog, flat-faced and short-muzzled, but this does not affect its breathing.

Health
A UK survey based on the lifespan of 96 Bullmastiffs found a median age of 7.5 years.

Health concerns within the breed include hip and elbow dysplasia, progressive retinal atrophy, bloat, and cancer, with a relatively high incidence of lymphoma and mast cell tumours. Bullmastiffs are prone to certain hereditary diseases, including:
 Hip dysplasia, affecting 24.5% of individuals 
 Elbow dysplasia, affecting 13.8% of individuals,
 Entropion, hypothyroidism affecting 2.8% of individuals, 
 Lymphoma
 Progressive retinal atrophy is a particular problem, since the trait is an autosomal dominant one. (This has recently been called into question by another medical team and has been proven that some Bullmastiffs have autosomal recessive PRA genes. In America, this is being investigated by the American Bullmastiff Health and Research Committee, and the DNA Optigen test only works for dominant genes, so it is considered inadequate at this time.)

See also
 List of dog breeds
 Mastiff (disambiguation)
 See Spot Run

References

FCI breeds
Dog breeds originating in England
Mastiffs